Mary Taylor Simeti is an American author specializing in Sicilian cuisine and its history. She is a former regular contributor to the New York Times and to the Financial Times.

Biography 
Mary Taylor Simeti was born in 1941 in New York City. She is the daughter of Francis Henry Taylor, then director of the Metropolitan Museum of Art. In 1962 she graduated from Radcliffe College with a major in history. She travelled to Sicily to work with social activist Danilo Dolci. In Sicily she met her future husband, Antonio Simeti, professor of agricultural economics at the University of Palermo. Together they restored the Simetis' farm near Alcamo where they produce organic olive oil and wine.

Books 
 “On Persephone’s Island. A Sicilian Journal“, Alfred Knopf, 1986, .
 “Pomp and Sustenance: Twenty-Five Centuries of Sicilian Food“, Alfred Knopf, 1989, .  British edition: “Sicilian Food: Recipes from Italy's Abundant Isle“, Grub Street Cookery, 2009, .
 “Bitter Almonds: Recollections and Recipes of a Sicilian Girlhood”, written with Maria Grammatico. Morrow, 1994, .  Italian version: “Mandorle amare”,  Flaccovio Editore, 2004, .
 “Travels With a Medieval Queen. The Journey of a Sicilian Princess to Reclaim Her Father's Crown“, Farrar Straus Giroux, 2001, .
 “Fumo e arrosto: Escursioni nel paesaggio letterario e gastronomico della Sicilia”, Flaccovio Editore 2008
 “Sicilian Summer: An Adventure in Cooking with My Grandsons“, Silverwood Books, 2017, .

References

External links 
 
 Website of the Simeti-Taylor Organic Farm in Sicily
 BBC Food Programme."My Food Hero: Dan Saladino meets Mary Taylor Simeti"

1941 births
Living people
Women food writers
American food writers
Radcliffe College alumni
People from Alcamo
Historians of Sicily